Hyman Brand Hebrew Academy is a K-12 community Jewish Day School located on the Jewish Community Campus in Overland Park, Kansas.  A private school offering Judaic instruction along with a college-preparatory secular education, HBHA serves about 230-250 students from diverse reform through orthodox backgrounds.  A 2005 Blue Ribbon Kansas School, Hyman Brand Hebrew Academy celebrated its 50th anniversary in the 2015–16 school year.

External links
 Hyman Brand Hebrew Academy website

Private elementary schools in Kansas
Private middle schools in Kansas
Private high schools in Kansas
Jews and Judaism in Kansas
Schools in Johnson County, Kansas
Education in Overland Park, Kansas
1966 establishments in Kansas